Saint-Martin-d'Aubigny is a commune in the Manche department in Normandy in north-western France.

History
The name of Aubigny is mentioned under diverse forms in Medieval Latin and in Old French : Albignio (11th century); Albigneio (ab. 1175); Aubigni (ab 1180). Its original form was *Albiniācum, a Romanization of the name of an earlier Gallo-Roman property (suffix -(i)acum < Gaulish Celtic -ako) + the personal name of its owner, a certain Albinius, Latin personal name popular in Gaul at that time.

See also
Communes of the Manche department

References

Saintmartindaubigny